Wells Stabler (October 31, 1919 – November 13, 2009) was an American Career Foreign Service Officer who served as Chargé d'Affaires ad interim to Jordan (February 18, 1949 - February 1950) and Ambassador Extraordinary and Plenipotentiary to Spain (1975-1978). It was during his tenure in Spain that Francisco Franco died and Spain transitioned to a constitutional democracy.

Stabler was born in Boston, Massachusetts, on October 31, 1919. After graduating from Harvard, he entered the State Department in the early 1940s. When the United States recognized Israel, Stabler became Vice Consul in Jerusalem. He died in Washington, D.C., on November 13, 2009, at the age of 90.

References

External links
The Association for Diplomatic Studies and Training Foreign Affairs Oral History Project AMBASSADOR WELLS STABLER

1919 births
2009 deaths
Harvard University alumni
American expatriates in Jordan
People from Boston
Ambassadors of the United States to Spain
20th-century American diplomats